Tirupathur taluk is a taluk in Tirupathur district of the Indian state of Tamil Nadu. The headquarters of the taluk is the town of Tirupathur. It is known as the "Sandalwood Town" due to the abundant availability of sandalwood trees in the surrounding hills. On 15 August 2019, Chief Minister of Tamil Nadu, Edapaadi K. Palanisami announced Tirupathur district, as a new district of Tamil Nadu.

Population 

In the 2001 Indian census, the taluk of Tirupathur had a population of 50,455 with 23,656 males and 22,799 females. There were 973 women for every 1,000 men. The taluk had a literacy rate of 66.07%. The total number of households was 111,192.

In the 2011 census, Tirupathur taluk had a population of 67,396.

Tirupathur is a town located in Tirupathur district, India, which is one of the oldest towns in Tamil Nadu. It is located approximately 40 km from Krishnagiri, 85 km from Hosur, 85 km from Thiruvannamalai and 125 km from Bangalore. The town has mainly small-scale industries and mills. It is an important commercial center from time immemorial (whereas Vaniyambadi and Ambur, which were once smaller towns, have recently flourished). It was a revenue subdivision during British raj and remains so. It has Old Shiva, Vishnu temples and Tanks (Big Tank & Small Tank) built during the Hoysala Dynasty. It is well connected by road and rail to other important cities of Tamil Nadu such as Thiruvannamalai, Chennai, Salem, Coimbatore and Vellore and to Bangalore in Karnataka. This town is also famous in Islamic religious circles as many great saints "Awliyas" had made it their hometown. Some of them are buried at various places in the town, including Syed Sha Mohammed alias Syed Khawja Meeran Hussaini Jaffari, Syed ShaAmeenuddin Hussaini Chisty ur Kahdri (who is better known as Munshi Hazrath); he was the last among a series of saints who have lived and have been buried at Tirupathur.

The name Tirupathur means a group of ten villages/small towns. There exists a village called Aathiyur (Aathi means Begin) in the southern fringes of the Town and Kodiyur (Kodi means End) in the northern fringes of the town. It is surrounded by several of these villages, making Tirupathur a Taluk. Tirupathur's population and land area are good enough to have political representations in the state legislature of Tamil Nadu (Member of the Legislative Assembly), and part of Thiruvannamalai constituency for the central/federal legislature of India (Member of Parliament as of 2009 elections).
Tirupathur Municipality
Tirupathur Municipality was constituted as a third-grade municipality in the year 1886. As per G.O. No. 194, date: 10.02.1970, classified as Second Grade Municipality. At present from 1.4.1977 onwards as per G.O. No. 654, classified as first grade municipality.

Demographics
In the 2001 Indian census, Tirupathur had a population of 60,803. Males constituted 51% of the population and females 49%. Tirupathur had an average literacy rate of 73%, significantly higher than the national average of 59.5%: male literacy was 79%, and female literacy was 67%. In 2001 in Tirupathur, 11% of the population was under 6 years of age.

In the 2011 census, the city of Tirupathur had a population of 63,798. Males constituted 51% of the population and females 49%. Tirupathur had an average literacy rate of 78%, significantly higher than the national average of 59.5%: male literacy was 80%, and female literacy was 76%. In 2011 in Tirupathur, 11% of the population was under 6 years of age.

Geography
It is known as the "Sandalwood Town" due to the abundant availability of sandalwood trees in the surrounding hills. It is very close to the 4th major hill station of Tamil Nadu, the Yelagiri hills, which is also known as the Poor man's Ooty. The town is at an average elevation of 388 m.

Economy
This area is very famous for sandalwood.  It claims to be the second biggest depot in Asia. The main businesses is goldsmithing and selling raw products.

Location of Tirupathur
The strategic location of this town is such that the town acts as an "urban magnet" to radius of 20 to 25 km all-round. Nearly 200 villages are mainly depending on this town for all their urban needs. The growth is dominated by wholesale agriculture production and Sandalwood. The Urban Municipal town spreads over an extent of 9.26 km2; this is a class-I town in Vellore District; is based on population range; floating population is increasing day by day.

Infrastructure
The Tirupathur town has 56.059 km length of roads and the municipality is maintaining 'B' Grade Bus stand in the heart of the town. There is a century old municipal market having 413 shops which helps in promoting commercial and economic activities of the town.

Climate
The town is known for recording coldest temperature in the Tamil Nadu plains during winter. The seasonal climate conditions are moderate and the weather is uniformly salubrious. The town experiences hot summers and cool winters.

The town gets its majority of rainfall during the southwest monsoon period. September and October are the wettest months with around 400 mm of rain being received in these two months. The town also experiences fairly frequent thunderstorms in late April and May, which gives necessary relief from the heat, along with the dip in night temperatures. The warmest nights are in May, when the town has an average minimum temperature of 23.4 °C. The coldest nights are in January, when the average minimum temperatures drop to 16.1 °C. May is the hottest month with an average maximum of 37.0 °C.

The highest ever temperature recorded in the town is 46.3 °C on 7 May 1976. The lowest ever recorded temperature is 10.2 °C on 15 December 1974. The highest 24‑hour precipitation is 167.3mm received on 4 November 1966.
The average annual rainfall being received in the town is 982 mm.

Nature of soil
The major group of soils that are found in the town are black and red varieties. The red soil constitutes 90% while black soil only 10%.

Historical moments
Tirupattur is called as the "Sandal City", "Sandal Kingdom". Even a rough estimation cannot easily be established on the origin of Tirupathur town, owing to its antiquity.

Tirupattur is known for having the FIRST FEMALE IAS OFFICER in India, Anna Rajam Malhotra, who was posted as the Sub Collector of Tirupattur in Madras State, becoming the first woman to do so. The Collector office is currently serving the nation as the Tirupathur railway junction and railway residence. 

Through, the inscriptions, so far surveyed by Archaeological Survey of India in Tirupathur, it is estimated that this town is more than 1600 years old. During the regimes of various rulers like Cholas, Vijaya Nagara dynasty, Hoysalas the town had been referred to, by the following names:
Sri Mathava Chaturvedi Mangalam, Veera Narayana Chaturvedi Mangalam, Tiruperur and Brahmapuram (Brahmeeswaram). The present name "Tirupathur" might have got derived from "Tiruperur". Erstwhile "Tiruperur" or "Sri Madhava Chaturvedi Mangalam" was in "Eyyil Nadu", subdivision of "Nigarili Chola Mandalam", division of "Chola Empire".

There existed a fort in the eastern part of the town around 800 years ago. Its entrance might have been near the Kottai Darwaja Sri Veera Anjaneyar Temple, since the word "Kottai" in Tamil means "Fort", and the word "Darwaja" in Hindi/Urdu means "Gate" or "Door". The area is still known as "Kottai"(fort).

The town was ruled by Cholas, Pallavas, Hoysalas, Vijaya Nagara rulers, Vallala Maharajan, Sambuvarayars, Tipu, Nawabs of Arcot and undoubtedly by the British.

Map routes

Roadways
The Tamil Nadu state Bus transport corporation (TNSTC) is providing 85% of transport facilities to this town.
Tirupathur is well connected by road and rail to major cities of India. Regarding transportation linkage.
The highway (NH 46) from Chennai to Krishnagiri (via) Natrampalli passes through the outskirts of the town.
The town is separated by a distance with Chennai (225 km).
Bangalore (130 km), Vellore (87 km) and Salem (108 km).
Several State Highways connect the town from Dharmapuri (60 km), Krishnagiri (40 km) Vaniyambadi (22 km) and Salem (108 km) section.
TNSTC also operates luxury Volvo A/C buses (Route no:502B) to Chennai daily.
Frequent buses are there to Chennai, Vellore, Salem, Bangalore, Villupuram.

Railways
Tirupathur railway station is under the administrative control of the Southern Railways. It is 2 km away from bus stand. Traveling north,  (8 km) is the nearest junction and going south-west, Samalpatti is the next station. Due to proximity to the Jolarpet railway junction only few express trains halt here.

The Yelagiri Express runs from Jolarpettai to Chennai every day.

The West Coast Express (Mangalore–Chennai Central–Manglore) stops at Tiruppattur railway station every day.
The other trains that stop at Tirupathur station are:
Yercaud Express – Daily
Bangalore–Kanyakumari Express – Daily
West Coast Express – Daily
Dhanbad–Allepey Express – Daily
Erode–Jolarpettai Passenger
Katpadi–Salem Passenger
Nagercoil–Chennai Central Express-only Monday
Nagercoil–Mumbai CST Express – except Thursday, Saturday, Sunday
Ernakulam Junction–Yeshwantpur Express – only Tuesday
Ernakulam Junction–Bangalore Superfast Express – only Monday and Wednesday
Trivandrum Central–Bangalore City Junction Express – only on Thursday
Trivandrum Central–Mumbai CST Express – only Saturday
Coimbatore–Rajkot Express – only Friday
Trivandrum Central–Bangalore City Junction Superfast Express – only Sunday

Air
The nearest airports:

Domestic:
 Salem (105 km)
 Vellore Air Strip (85 km)

International:
 Bengaluru (135 km)
 Chennai (225 km)

Schools

CBSE Schools
Don Bosco School of Excellence
Shri Nandanam International 
Vijay Vidhyalaya CBSE School.
Green Valley Public School
Shri Ramesh CBSE international school
Vailankanni public school

Elementary schools
 Our Lady's School.
 Vivekananda Aided Elementary School
 TMS Aided Elementary School
 Government Garden Aided Elementary School

Higher Secondary Schools

 Don Bosco Matriculation higher secondary school
 Our Lady's Nursery and Primary School
 Dominic Savio Higher Secondary School
 Mary Immaculate Higher Secondary School
 Shepherds Matriculation Higher Secondary School
 C.S.I Girls Matriculation Higher Secondary School
 YMCA Brown Matriculation Higher Secondary School
 Holy Cross Matriculation Higher Secondary School
 Ramakrishna Higher Secondary School
 Shri Amrita Higher Secondary School
 Ubaibas Girls Higher Secondary School
 TMS Higher Secondary School
 Good Will Matriculation Higher Secondary School
 I.V.N Govt Higher Secondary School
 St. Charles Matriculation Higher Secondary School
 Lions Matriculation Higher Secondary School
 Al Ameen Matriculation Higher Secondary School
 Osmania Higher Secondary School
 Meenakshi Government Girls Higher Secondary School
 Government Boys Higher Secondary School
 Government Garden High School
 RamaKrishna Vidhyalaya Matriculation Higher Secondary School
 Vijayashanthi Vidyalaya Matriculation Higher Secondary School
 Lingannamani Matriculation Higher Secondary School
 Dewan Mohammed Memorial Matriculation Higher Secondary School
 Pudupet Higher Secondary School
 Government Higher Secondary School ANDIYAPPANUR

Music Academy
The Joyful Noise Music Academy

Colleges

Arts Colleges
 Tirupattur Arts and Science College
 Sacred Heart College (Autonomous)
 Marappan Lakshmiammal Arts And Science College
 Holy Cross Arts and Science College for Women
 Government College of Arts and Science
 Vannavil Arts and Science College
 (A Don Bosco Institution)
 Yelagiri Arts and Science College
 Islamiah college (Autonomous), Vaniyambadi.

BEd Colleges
 Amrita College of Education
 Amritalaya College of Education
 Dr. David Raja and Dr. Chandraleka College of Education
 G.P. Secondary Teacher Education Training College
 Sri Kalaimagal College of Education
 St. Joseph Women's College of Education
 T.K. Raja College of Education
 Thirumal College of Education
 TES Teacher Training Institute

Nursing College
Jeya Nursing College, Tirupathur

Polytechnic
 Tirupattur Polytechnic College
 Pandian Polytechnic College
 G.P Polytechnic College
 Sri Nandhanam Polytechnic College
 Sri Padmam Polytechnic College
 Kamaraj Polytechnic College
 Government Polytechnic College

Engineering Colleges
 Sri Nandhanam College of Engineering & Technology
 Sri Nandhanam Maritime Academy
 Podhygai College of Engineering & Technology
 Bharathidasan Engineering college

Teacher Training Institutes
 Mary Immaculate Teacher Training Institute
 Amritalaya Teacher Training Institute
 Shri Amrita Teacher Training Institute
 Tirupattur Teacher Training Institute
 G.Ponnusamy Teacher Training Institute
 Sri Padmam Teacher Training Institute
 TES Teacher Training Institute, Jayapuram
 Dr. David Raja Teacher Training Institute, Vengalapuram

Computer Institutes
Bosco Integrated Computing Service
Nirmal Multi-Tech Industries
Aptech Computer Education
Anugraha Computer Center
CRN computer Education
SRM Infotec.

Politics

Tirupathur assembly constituency is part of Tiruvannamalai (Lok Sabha constituency).

Municipal Chairman
S Arasu M.A, MEd

References

External links
 Tirupathur Official Website 
 /Tirupathur map

Taluks of Tirupathur district